Pardeshi is a Nepalese movie produced by Rajesh Banshal and directed by Narayan Rayamajhi. The movie was released in October 2015 and was one of the top 10 movies of that year. An older movie by the same name was released in 1998: Paradeshi, featuring Rajesh Hamal and Bipana Thapa.

The director Narayan Rayamajhi’s previous venture with Prashanta Tamang was a movie titled ‘Gorkha Paltan’. The movie features Prashant Tamang and was directed by Narayan Rayamajhi and received good reviews and over a million views on YouTube.

Cast
Actor: Prashant Tamang, Rajani K.C.
Director: Narayan Rayamajhi
Producer: Rajesh Bansal & Narayan Rayamajhi
Music Director: BB Anuragi
Cinematographer: Shiva Dhakal
Choreographer: Govinda Rai
Editor: Banish Shah
Recording Studio: Reema Films /Prisma Digital
Recordist: Shyam Shwet Rasaili
VFX : Akki Sharma, Sudeep Acharya

References

2010s Nepali-language films
Films shot in Kathmandu
Nepalese drama films
2015 films